Deh Sefid-e Olya (also Romanized as Deh Sefīd-e ‘Olyā and Deh Sefīd ‘Olyā) is a village in Zagheh Rural District, Zagheh District, Khorramabad County, Lorestan Province, Iran. At the 2006 census, its population was 65, in 11 families.

References 

Towns and villages in Khorramabad County